Poritiphilus is a Gram-negative, aerobic, non-endospore-forming and non-motile genus of bacteria from the family of Flavobacteriaceae with one known species (Poritiphilus flavus). Poritiphilus flavus has been isolated from the coral Porites lutea.

References

Flavobacteria
Bacteria genera
Monotypic bacteria genera
Taxa described in 2020